Valdiram Caetano de Morais (30 October 1982 – 20 April 2019) was a Brazilian professional footballer who played as a striker.

Early life and family
Valdiram was born in Canhotinho, Brazil.

Career
Valdiram played for Vasco da Gama, where he was top scorer in the 2006 Copa do Brasil. He left the club in 2007, and played for 18 different clubs until 2011, including Noroeste, Avenida, Tupi, Central, Ferroviário and Duque de Caxias.

Valdiram's off-the-field problems halted his career in 2011, but he returned in 2017 with Atlântico.

Personal life
Valdiram struggled with substance abuse. He spent time in drug rehabilitation but lived on the streets before being found beaten to death in São Paulo in April 2019.

References

1982 births
2019 deaths
Brazilian footballers
CR Vasco da Gama players
Esporte Clube Noroeste players
Esporte Clube Avenida players
Tupi Football Club players
Central Sport Club players
Ferroviário Atlético Clube (CE) players
Duque de Caxias Futebol Clube players
Association football forwards
People murdered in Brazil
Deaths by beating
Sportspeople from Pernambuco